Zeno-Watch is a Swiss watchmaker established in 1868, but the Zeno name has been in use only since 1922. Specializing in aviation watches, they are one of the few independent Swiss watch manufacturers still in operation. Their factory is in Basel, Switzerland.

History

Beginnings
Zeno's history began in 1868 with watchmaker Jules Godat, the founder of a small pocket watch manufacturing company (Godat & Co.) in La Chaux-de-Fonds, in the heart of the Swiss watchmaking industry. He produced, in very small quantities, fine pocket watches featuring solid silver cases and lady pendant watches. He built a small factory, which was taken over in 1920 by A. Eigeldinger & Fils.

Eigeldinger specialized in wrist watches for the army. They produced watches in stainless steel, silver, gold and platinum, with mechanical movements up to 43mm. Their registered brands were Zeno, Strand and Solvex. The son of the owner, Andre-Charles Eigeldinger, introduced Zeno. In Greek, the name means "graceful."

The first Zeno watches
The first Zeno watches were made in 1922 with each piece marked with a Swiss cross on the back of the casing. The company has since continued to innovate watch manufacturing techniques. In 1949, Zeno watches were exhibited for the first time at the Swiss Watch Fair in Basel.

In 1966, Dr. Peter Atteslander and Eric Enggist bought the rights to Zeno and later sold them to Mr. Felix W. Huber in 1973. Mr. Huber had worked for the company since 1964.

Zeno's workshops gained international attention in 1969 with the legendary and futuristic "Spacemen" model, the production of the vacuum diving watch called the "Compressor," and with the takeover of several well-known Swiss watch factories.

Current products
The best known watches produced by Zeno are in the "Pilot Classic" collection. Today's model compares very favorably with the vintage Zeno Pilot Basic 1965 original. The range of products extends from mechanical to quartz technology wrist watches with analogue displays, collectors' wristwatches, pocket watches and sport chronographs in every combination of materials. Zeno has enlarged their Pilot watch family of products. Since 1999 they have produced a large range of pilot watches in new sizes, and many COSC certificated chronometers. Zeno also makes diving watches used by the Swiss Army for their frogmen, with models rated for up to 300 meters (1000 feet) depth.

Notes

External links
 Official site 
 Zeno-Watch Basel (Watch-Wiki)
 Zeno Army Diver 300M review (Watcharama)
 Commercial register of canton Basel-Stadt

Watch manufacturing companies of Switzerland
Manufacturing companies based in Basel
Manufacturing companies established in 1868
Swiss watch brands
Swiss companies established in 1868